A personal stereo, or personal cassette player, is a portable audio player using an audiocassette player, battery power and in some cases an AM/FM radio.  This allows the user to listen to music through headphones while walking, jogging or relaxing. Personal stereos typically have a belt clip or a shoulder strap so a user can attach the device to a belt or wear it over their shoulder. Some personal stereos came with a separate battery case.

History 
Astraltune, also known as the Astraltune Stereopack, was a personal stereo player created by Roy and Andy Bowers that appeared on the market in Reno Nevada on September 1, 1975. The tape deck fit into a padded sleeve and was worn on the chest using a harness. The headphones hung under the chin rather than over the head. Controls were protected by a zippered flap that faced upwards. Astraltune filed for trademark in 1978 and patent of invention in 1980 but were denied.

The first patented personal stereo was the Stereobelt, devised by West German-Brazilian Andreas Pavel in 1977. Pavel attempted to commercialise his belt design but failed. 

The Sony Walkman was released in 1979, created by Akio Morita, Masaru Ibuka (the co-founders of Sony) and Kozo Ohsone. It became a popular and widely imitated consumer item in the 1980s. In everyday language, "walkman" became a generic term, referring to any personal stereo, regardless of producer or brand. The spread of personal stereo devices contributed to tape cassettes outselling vinyl records for the first time in 1983. The introduction of the personal stereo coincided with the 1980s aerobics vogue, making it very popular to listen to music during workouts. Moreover, the prevalence of portable cassette players correlates with a 30-percent increase of people walking for exercise between 1987 and 1997. 

In the 1990s, portable CD players became the most popular personal stereos. In the 2000s, digital players like the iPod became the dominant personal stereos. During this period, cell phones and smartphones also became popular music listening devices.

References

Further reading 
 Erlmann, Veit (ed.) Hearing Cultures. Essays on Sound, Listening, and Modernity, New York: Berg Publishers, 2004. Cf. Chapter 9: "Thinking About Sound, Proximity, and Distance in Western Experience: The Case of Odysseus's Walkman" by Michael Bull.

Portable audio players
Products introduced in 1979